The Ministry of Agriculture is a government ministry in Zambia. It is headed by the Minister of Agriculture and is mandated to design, implement and manage the government's activities in the agricultural sector.

The ministry managed agricultural, fisheries and livestock activities until 2015, when the departments of fisheries and livestock were merged to form the Ministry of Fisheries and Livestock.

List of ministers

Zambia Agricultural Research Institute
The Zambia Agricultural Research Institute (ZARI), which falls under the Ministry of Agriculture, is Zambia's largest agriculture research institute. It is mandated is to provide specialized research and advice to farmers and the government. ZARI is one of the principal research organizations studying grains in Zambia.

References

External links
Official website

Agriculture ministries
Agriculture
Agricultural organisations based in Zambia
 
Zambia